Interferon alpha-inducible protein 27 is a protein that in humans is encoded by the IFI27 gene.

References

Further reading